NA Hussein Dey Volleyball is a professional Volleyball team based in Hussein Dey, Algeria. It plays in Algerian Men's Volleyball League. The team won the 1990 African Clubs Championship title. The club was founded in 1947.

Honors

National Men's Achievements
Algerian Championship :
 Winners (14 titles) : (1971, 1972, 1973, 1974, 1975, 1976, 1977, 1978, 1983, 1984, 1988, 1992, 1993, 1996)

Algerian Cup :
 Winners (11 titles) : (1970, 1971, 1972, 1974, 1975, 1976, 1977, 1980, 1986, 1987, 1993)

International Men's competitions
African Clubs Championship :
 Winners (1 title) : (1990)

National Women's Achievements
Algerian Championship :
 Winners (10 titles) : (1963, 1964, 1965, 1966, 1967, 1968, 1969, 1970, 1971, 1977)

Algerian Cup :
 Winners (7 titles) : (1967, 1968, 1969, 1970, 1971, 1972, 1989)

Notable players

Algerian volleyball clubs
Volleyball clubs established in 1947
1947 establishments in Algeria
Sports teams in Algeria